The 2005 Dr. Pepper SEC Championship Game was played on December 3, 2005 in the Georgia Dome in Atlanta, Georgia.  The game determined the 2005 football champion of the Southeastern Conference.  The Georgia Bulldogs, winners of the Eastern division of the SEC, defeated the LSU Tigers, who won the Western division, by a score of 34-14.  This was the second time the two teams have met in the conference championship game.  The first time was in 2003 when LSU defeated Georgia by the score 34-13.

Selection process

The SEC Championship Game matches up the winner of the Eastern and Western divisions of the Southeastern Conference.  The game was first played in 1992, when the conference expanded from 10 to 12 teams with the addition of Arkansas and South Carolina.  The SEC was the first conference in college football to have a conference championship game. By 2005, four other conferences had conference championship games (Big 12, ACC, CUSA & MAC).

Regular season

SEC East
The battle for the SEC East was a three-way battle for the entire conference season among the Georgia Bulldogs, Florida Gators, and South Carolina Gamecocks. The Georgia Bulldogs entered the season with high hopes and rattled off a 5-0 conference record (South Carolina, Mississippi State, Tennessee, Vanderbilt, and Arkansas) before heading to Jacksonville for the annual battle with the Florida Gators.  Georgia was ranked #4 in both polls, and a win would have sealed the SEC East crown. But, with starting quarterback D.J. Shockley sidelined with an injury suffered in the Homecoming victory against Arkansas, Joe Tereshinski, III the Gators prevailed, 14-10 and dealt the Bulldogs their first loss of the season.  Brandon Coutu missed two field goals late in the game which proved the difference in the game.

Again with the SEC East crown on the line, the Bulldogs played the Auburn Tigers at home in a series which traditionally favors the road-team.  Auburn won the game on a John Vaughn 20 yard field goal with six seconds remaining, 31-30. On the third attempt to punch their ticket to Atlanta, the Bulldogs defeated Kentucky 45-13 on Senior Day.  A loss to the Wildcats would have created a three-way tie (Florida and South Carolina) for the SEC East Crown.  Georgia's win clinched their 5th SEC East crown, and 3rd trip to the title game.

SEC West
The SEC West race was decided in Baton Rouge on October 22 when the LSU Tigers defeated the Auburn Tigers 20-17 in overtime. LSU had one conference loss coming into the game (an overtime loss against Tennessee) and Auburn was unblemished.  Both teams remained tied with one conference loss through the rest of the season.  Auburn was awarded its 5th Divisional Title, LSU its 5th as well, and LSU represented the SEC West in the title game for the 3rd time.

Game summary
The Bulldogs' senior quarterback D. J. Shockley threw for 112 yards and two touchdowns while also running for a score. After LSU QB JaMarcus Russell left the game in the third quarter with an injury, backup Matt Flynn threw an interception returned for the touchdown by Tim Jennings to seal Georgia's 34–14 victory.

Scoring summary

Game statistics

References

External links
2005 SEC Championship Game at SECSports.com

SEC Championship
SEC Championship Game
LSU Tigers football games
Georgia Bulldogs football games
December 2005 sports events in the United States
2005 in sports in Georgia (U.S. state)
2005 in Atlanta